Sreekumar Rajagopalan Nair (born 2 November 1978) is a former Indian first class cricketer who played for Kerala in domestic cricket. He is a left-handed middle order batsman and slow left arm orthodox bowler. Sreekumar was also a former captain of Kerala.
He holds the record for the highest individual score by a Kerala batsman, with a score of 306 not out. He made this score against Services at Fort Maidan in Palakkad, during the 2007 season.

References

External links

Kerala cricketers
Assam cricketers
South Zone cricketers
Indian cricketers
1978 births
Living people
Sree Kerala Varma College alumni
Cricketers from Kerala